Christopher Cerf may refer to:
Christopher Cerf (producer) (born 1941), American writer, actor, and record and television producer
Christopher Cerf (school administrator) (born c. 1954), American education administrator and lawyer